Hengshan West railway stationis a railway station located in Hengshan County, Hengyang, Hunan, China.

The station opened in 2009. It is on the Hunan–Guangxi railway and the Wuhan–Guangzhou high-speed railway, a segment of the Beijing–Guangzhou high-speed railway.

Railway stations in Hunan
Railway stations in China opened in 2009
Stations on the Wuhan–Guangzhou High-Speed Railway